The 2019 Nigerian House of Representatives elections in Oyo State was held on February 23, 2019, to elect members of the House of Representatives to represent Oyo State, Nigeria.

Overview

Summary

Results

Afijio/Atiba/Oyo East/Oyo West 
A total of 16 candidates registered with the Independent National Electoral Commission to contest in the election. APC candidate Akeem Adeyemi won the election, defeating PDP Abdulfatai Adeyemi and 14 other party candidates. Akeem Adeyemi received 32.19% of the votes, while Fatai Adeyemi received 27.04%.

Akinyele/Lagelu 
A total of 17 candidates registered with the Independent National Electoral Commission to contest in the election. APC candidate George Akintola won the election, defeating PDP Kunle Yusuf and 15 other candidates. Akintola received 33.19% of the votes, while Yusuf received 27.15%.

Atisbo/Saki East/Saki West 
A total of 14 candidates registered with the Independent National Electoral Commission to contest in the election. APC candidate Olajide Olatubosun won the election, defeating PDP Fasasi Adeagbo and 12 other party candidates. Olatubosun received 41.36% of the votes, while Adeagbo received 36.822%.

Egbeda/Ona-Ara 
A total of 20 candidates registered with the Independent National Electoral Commission to contest in the election. APC candidate Akinola Alabi won the election, defeating PDP Ayokunle Iyanda and 18 other candidates. Alabi received 49.75% of the votes, while Iyanda received 31.33%.

Ibadan North East/Ibadan South East 
A total of 15 candidates registered with the Independent National Electoral Commission to contest in the election. PDP candidate Abass Adigun won the election, defeating APC Deji Aboderin and 12 other candidates. Adigun received 34.37% of the votes, while Aboderin received 26.46%.

Ibadan North 
A total of 14 candidates registered with the Independent National Electoral Commission to contest in the election. APC candidate Olaide Akinremi won the election, defeating PDP Ademola Omotoso and 12 other party candidates. Akinremi received 33.88% of the votes, while Omotoso received 32.26%.

Ibadan North West/Ibadan South West 
A total of 16 candidates registered with the Independent National Electoral Commission to contest in the election. PDP candidate Adedeji Olajide won the election, defeating APC Saheed Fijabi and 14 other party candidates. Olajide received 37.04% of the votes, while Fijabi  received 33.38%.

Ibarapa Central/Ibarapa North 
A total of 13 candidates registered with the Independent National Electoral Commission to contest in the election. PDP candidate Ajibola Muraina won the election, defeating APC Obafemi Ojo and 11 other party candidates. Muraina received 38.77% of the votes, while Ojo received 37.69%.

Ibarapa East/Ido 
A total of 15 candidates registered with the Independent National Electoral Commission to contest in the election. PDP candidate Oluyemi Adewale-Taiwo won the election, defeating APC Adeniyi Olowofela and 13 other party candidates. Adewale-Taiwo received 39.09% of the votes, while Olowofela received 36.36%.

Irepo/Olurunsogo/Orelope 
A total of 11 candidates registered with the Independent National Electoral Commission to contest in the election. APC candidate Olumide Ojerinde won the election, defeating PDP Michael Okunlade and 9 other party candidates. Ojerinde received 38.55% of the votes, while Okunlade  received 23.86%.

Iseyin/Kajola/Iwajowa/Itesiwaju 
A total of 13 candidates registered with the Independent National Electoral Commission to contest in the election. APC candidate Shina Peller won the election, defeating PDP Oyesina Oyedeji and 11 other party candidates. Peller received 47.43% of the votes, while Oyedeji received 33.71%.

Ogbomoso North/Ogbomoso South/Orire 
A total of 14 candidates registered with the Independent National Electoral Commission to contest in the election. ADP candidate Ajao Adejumo won the election, defeating PDP Segun Ogunwuyi and 12 other party candidates. Adejumo received 38.65% of the votes, while Ogunwuyi received 27.80%.

Ogo-Oluwa/Surulere 
A total of 11 candidates registered with the Independent National Electoral Commission to contest in the election. APC candidate Olusegun Odebunmi won the election, defeating ADP Abiola Alagbe and 9 other party candidates. Odebunmi received 39.43% of the votes, while Alagbe received 32.55%.

Oluyole 
A total of 13 candidates registered with the Independent National Electoral Commission to contest in the election. APC candidate Tolulope Akande-Sadipe won the election, defeating PDP Olawale Mogbonjubola and 11 other party candidates. Akande-Sadipe received 36.80% of the votes, while Mogbonjubola received 32.53%.

References 

Oyo
Oyo State elections